Clayland Boyden Gray (born February 6, 1943) is an American lawyer and former diplomat who served as White House Counsel from 1989 to 1993 and as U.S. Ambassador to the European Union from 2006 to 2007. He is a founding partner of the Washington, D.C.-based law firm Boyden Gray & Associates LLP.

Early life and education

Gray was born in 1943 in Winston-Salem, North Carolina. His father, Gordon Gray, was a lawyer who served as U.S. National Security Advisor under President Dwight D. Eisenhower. Gray's grandfather, Bowman Gray Sr., was the president of the R.J. Reynolds Tobacco Company.

Gray attended Fay School and St. Mark's School in Southborough, Massachusetts. He graduated magna cum laude from Harvard University in 1964, where he wrote for The Harvard Crimson. He also served as a sergeant in the United States Marine Corps Reserve from 1965 to 1970.

Gray then attended the University of North Carolina School of Law, where he served as editor-in-chief of the North Carolina Law Review and graduated with high honors in 1968.

Career

After graduation, Gray clerked for Supreme Court Chief Justice Earl Warren. In 1968 he joined the firm of Wilmer Cutler & Pickering (now Wilmer Cutler Pickering Hale and Dorr), and became a partner in 1976. Gray took a leave of absence from the firm in 1981 to serve as legal counsel for Vice President George H. W. Bush. He also served as counsel to the Presidential Task Force on Regulatory Relief, chaired by Vice President Bush. Gray later served as Director of the Office of Transition Counsel for the Bush transition team, and as counsel to President Bush from 1989 to 1993. During this time, Gray became one of the main architects of the 1990 Clean Air Act Amendments that suggested market solutions for environmental problems.

He returned to Wilmer Cutler & Pickering in 1993, where his practice focused on a range of regulatory matters with an emphasis on environmental issues, including those relating to biotechnology, trade, clean air, and the management of risk. He also served as chairman of the section of Administrative Law and Regulatory Practice of the American Bar Association. Gray also served as co-chairman with former Majority Leader Dick Armey of FreedomWorks.

In October 2001, rumors indicated that Gray was considering running for an open US Senate seat in his native North Carolina, but he passed on the race. Former US Secretary of Labor Elizabeth Dole was elected in November 2002 to replace Jesse Helms, who chose to retire, rather than seek a sixth term.

Gray served on the Bush-Cheney Transition Department of Justice Advisory Committee, and as White House Counsel to US President George H. W. Bush. In 2002, he founded the Committee for Justice, a Washington, DC-based nonprofit dedicated to screening judicial and US Justice Department nominees.

In January 2006, President George W. Bush gave him a recess appointment as United States Ambassador to the European Union. He took a leave of absence from the law firm of Wilmer Cutler Pickering Hale and Dorr to accept that position. When Gray emerged as Bush's preferred candidate for the post of the US's ambassador to the EU in July 2005, the potential nomination deeply perturbed open source advocates, who viewed his ties to Microsoft with suspicion.

Gray's last government position was as Special Envoy for European Affairs and Special Envoy for Eurasian Energy at the Mission of the United States to the European Union, having been nominated by United States Secretary of State Condoleezza Rice on January 11, 2008. On March 31, the White House announced his appointment to the additional post of Special Envoy for Eurasian Energy. President H. W. Bush in 1993 awarded him the Presidential Citizens Medal.

He is a member of the board of directors at the Atlantic Council, The European Institute, FreedomWorks and America Abroad Media. In addition, Gray is or was a member of the Federalist Society, Harvard University's Committee on University Development, the Board of Trustees of the Washington Scholarship Fund, St. Mark's School, and National Cathedral School.

See also 

 List of law clerks of the Supreme Court of the United States (Chief Justice)

References

External links
 
Desmog Blog Biography of C. Boyden Gray
 
 Special Envoy and Ambassador C. Boyden Gray 

|-

|-

|-

1943 births
Ambassadors of the United States to the European Union
Atlantic Council
Bowman Gray family
Federalist Society members
Law clerks of the Supreme Court of the United States
Living people
North Carolina lawyers
North Carolina Republicans
People from Chapel Hill, North Carolina
People from Winston-Salem, North Carolina
Presidential Citizens Medal recipients
Reagan administration personnel
Recess appointments during the George W. Bush administration
St. Mark's School (Massachusetts) alumni
United States Marine Corps reservists
United States presidential advisors
United States Special Envoys
University of North Carolina School of Law alumni
White House Counsels
Fay School alumni
Wilmer Cutler Pickering Hale and Dorr partners
21st-century American diplomats
The Harvard Crimson people